This is a list of Telugu cinema films released in 2017.

Box office 
The top films release in 2017 by worldwide box office gross revenue in Indian rupees are as follows:

Scheduled releases

January–June

July–December

Dubbed films

References

2017
Telugu
Telugu